Chilavannoor, or Chilavannur, is a high-value residential area of Kochi in the state of Kerala, India.  Chilavannoor Road serves as its main artery, running from the Elamkulam junction and is 3 km in length.

Educational institutions nearby
Traum Academy for German & French languages

The Chilavannoor Kayal (backwaters) and the Ponneth Bhagavathy Temple are the main tourist attractions of the area.

Suburbs of Kochi